In Greek mythology, Cleodorus (Ancient Greek:Κλεόδωρον) was a Rhodian soldier during the Trojan War who was shot to death by Paris, son of King Priam and Queen Hecuba of Troy. Cleodorus himself was the son of Lernus and Amphiale.

See also 

 List of Trojan War characters

Note

References 

 Quintus Smyrnaeus, The Fall of Troy translated by Way. A. S. Loeb Classical Library Volume 19. London: William Heinemann, 1913. Online version at theoi.com
 Quintus Smyrnaeus, The Fall of Troy. Arthur S. Way. London: William Heinemann; New York: G.P. Putnam's Sons. 1913. Greek text available at the Perseus Digital Library

Achaeans (Homer)